Pancetta is a salt-cured pork belly meat product in a category known as salume. In Italy, it is often used to add depth to soups and pastas.

Uses
For cooking, it is often cut into cubes (cubetti di pancetta). In Italy, pancetta is commonly served as a sliced meat, sliced thin and eaten raw. It can also be used in carbonara pasta (although guanciale is generally regarded as more traditional).

Types
The two basic types of pancetta are the arrotolata (rolled) and stesa (flat). The arrotolata, salted, is mainly cut in thin slices and eaten raw as part of antipasti or simply as a component of a sandwich; the stesa is often used chopped as an ingredient in many recipes or cut in thick strips, that are usually eaten grilled. There is also a version of arrotolata, to which capicola is added in the center of the roll (pancetta coppata).

The rolled type is typical of northern Italy, while the flattened type is typical of central and southern Italy.

While most pancetta is salt-cured and dried, pancetta affumicata is salt-cured and smoked, similar to bacon.

Ingredients 
Most pancetta products are made using pork belly brined in a mixture of salt, dextrose, spices and spice extracts, sodium erythorbate, garlic, sugar, sodium nitrate, and/or sodium nitrite.

Production process 
 
The pork belly skin is removed before the pork is salted and held in a tub of brine for 10–14 days in a low-temperature and high-humidity environment. The brine is usually composed of salt, nitrite, ascorbate, spices such as black pepper, chilli, garlic, juniper, and rosemary, and sometimes nitrate.

After salting and brining, the pork is rolled, with layers of fat on the outside surrounding a meaty core. The rolled pork is then tightly packed into nettings or other fibrous casings. Rolling produces the pancetta's distinctive shape, while the casing prevents case hardening in the latter stages of the production process.

Following rolling and packing, the pork undergoes enzymatic reactions facilitated by exposure to a warm environment of 22–24 °C for 24 to 36 hours. It is simultaneously exposed to cold smokes for desirable colours and flavours and to prevent moulding.

Finally, the smoked pork is held at 12–14 °C and 72–75% relative humidity for 3–4 weeks for drying. The resulting pancetta retains approximately 70% of its original weight.

Preservation and shelf life 
Pancetta is preserved by curing. Curing is done using a spice and salt mixture containing nitrates or nitrites, which act to extend the shelf life of cured meats. Nitrates help remove excess moisture from the pork, decreasing water activity and limiting available free water for the growth of spoilage-causing and pathogenic microorganisms. Sodium nitrites are used to prevent the growth of botulism-causing bacteria and listeria monocytogenes, as well as imparting desirable flavour and colour.  Nitrates are said to act like time-released nitrites and are used in pancetta products that require longer periods of curing and drying.

Other constituents of the spice mixture also act to preserve the shelf life of pancetta—black pepper acts as an antibiotic, and sodium erythorbate is used as an antioxidant.

Pancetta kept in its original packaging can be stored for up to 12 months. After opening, it has a shelf life of around 2–3 weeks in the refrigerator and up to 3 months in the freezer.

Nutritional value 
One 30-g serving of pancetta contains around 5.0 g of protein, 11.0 g of fat, and 20–25 mg of cholesterol. One serving comprises between 15 and 22 percent of the accepted daily value of fats. Despite its high portion of daily fat value, pancetta has a lower fat content than other bacon products.

A single serving of pancetta contains around 540 mg of sodium. Consumption of processed meats is reported to be the second largest source of dietary sodium consumption, with bacon products leading processed pork products in sodium content.

Pancetta contains trace amounts of carbohydrates and no dietary fibre. These values can vary depending on processing, curing, and cooking methods.

Health concerns 

Associated cancer risk is likely related to the presence of nitrosamines in processed meat products like pancetta. Nitrosamines are carcinogenic compounds formed by the reaction of nitrites and amines. Nitrites are added during processing to act as preservatives and as antibacterial agents against clostridium botulinum, the toxin that causes botulism. Amines are naturally-occurring compounds found in meats. Nitrosamines are often formed in high temperatures, like those required to produce bacon, one processed meat in which nitrosamines have been consistently found.

Nitrosamines have also been shown to play a part in Alzheimer's and other neurodegenerative diseases, as well as type 1 and 2 diabetes.

Regulations 
Under Canadian regulations (C.R.C., Annex C.2), a cured meat product like pancetta is an edible meat product prepared with salt with at least 100 ppm of sodium nitrate or potassium nitrate.

In the United States, under the Food Safety and Inspection Service of the USDA, hormones are not allowed in hogs or poultry raised for food. Pork or poultry sold in the U.S. must be labelled as hormone-free and include a statement saying that federal regulations prohibit the use of hormones.

In the European Union, the labelling of pancetta is regulated under the protected designation of origin regime. Only pancetta produced in the Italian region of Calabria may be labelled as pancetta di Calabria.

See also

 
 
 
 
 Bacon

References

External links
 

Bacon
Cuts of pork
Dried meat
Italian cuisine
Pork
Salumi